Roger Turner may refer to:
Roger Turner (figure skater) (1901–1993), American figure skater
Roger Turner (garden designer) (fl. 1980s–1990s), British garden designer
Roger Turner (musician) (born 1946), English jazz percussionist

See also
Roger Singleton-Turner (fl. 1970s–2000s), British television director